Granby is a provincial electoral district in the Montérégie region of Quebec, Canada that elects members of the National Assembly of Quebec.  Its territory corresponds exactly to the city of Granby.

It was created for the 2012 election from part of the former Shefford electoral district.

Members of the National Assembly

Election results

|}

|}

References

External links
Information
 Elections Quebec

Maps
 2011 map  (PDF)
2001–2011 changes to Shefford (Flash)
 Electoral map of Montérégie region
 Quebec electoral map, 2011

Granby, Quebec
Granby